Ghenadie Ciobanu (born 6 April 1957) is a composer and politician from the Republic of Moldova, who served as the Minister of Culture of the Republic of Moldova (1997-2001) and served as a deputy in the Parliament of the Republic of Moldova in the Party faction Liberal Democrats from Moldova between 2010 and 2014. He composed symphonies, written works for chamber ensembles (instrumental), choral creations, theater and film music, etc.

Biography 
Ghenadie Ciobanu was born on 6 April 1957 in Brătușeni, Edineț, Moldovan SSR. He graduated from the "Gnesin" Musical-Pedagogical Institute in Moscow (currently the Russian Academy of Music), the piano faculty (1982) and the "Gavriil Muzicescu" Conservatory in Chisinau, composition department (1986). He is the author of more than one hundred musical works in the genres: opera, musical, symphonic, vocal-symphonic, choral, chamber, theater and film music. [1] . His creations have been performed in numerous recitals and concerts in the Republic of Moldova, Romania, France, Germany, Greece, Spain, Israel, Denmark, Poland, Russia, Estonia, Ukraine, USA, China, Italy, Bulgaria, Austria, Japan, Guatemala, San Salvador, Azerbaijan, Czech Republic, Hungary, Canada and others.
His works are recorded on CD's and broadcast by Denmark Radio, P2 (Copenhagen), Radio Romania‚ Radio Moscow, Teleradio Moldova, Radio Leipzig, Radio Amsterdam, radio and television stations in Italy, Spain (P2), Great Britain (GBEUR), Czech Republic (CZCR), Portugal (PTRTP), Switzerland (SESR), Croatia (HRHRTR) etc.

He is University professor, PhD at the Department of Musicology, Composition, Jazz of the Academy of Music, Theater and Fine Arts in Chisinau, guest professor at European universities and author of scientific communications on musicology. President of the Union of Composers and Musicologists of Moldova (1990 - 2012), Honorary President of UCMM (since 2012), President of the Association of Contemporary Music of Moldova (since 1993). He is the founder and Artistic Director of the “Days of New Music” International Festival  in Chisinau, founder and Artistic Director of the “Ars poetica” ensemble, producer and presenter of the radio cycles “The Studio of New Music”, “Continuum. Musical interferences ”,  “Musical compositional treasure ”etc. (Public company “Teleradio-Moldova”). During 1997-2001 he was Minister of Culture of the Republic of Moldova. In the periods 2010 - 2011, 2011 - 2014 he was a member of the Parliament of the Republic of Moldova
He holds national and international awards and distinctions, including the Order of the Star of Romania in the rank of Commander (2000); National Award of the Republic of Moldova (1998); honorary title Master of Arts (1999); the honorary title Doctor Honoris Causa of the “Gheorghe Dima” Academy of Music from Cluj-Napoca (1997); medal “150 years since the birth of Mihai Eminescu” (Romania, 2000), Order of Glory of Labor (Republic of Moldova, 2010); Order "Dimitrie Cantemir", of the Academy of Sciences of Moldova (2013), Award of the Union of Composers and Musicologists of Romania for 2019, Awards of the Union of Composers and Musicologists of the Republic of Moldova. [1] [2]

Works (selection) 

•	Ateh or The Revelations of Khazar Princess. Mono-opera-ballet, text by Milorad Pavic (from the “Dictionary of The Khazars”). Libretto by Ghenadie Ciobanu after Milorad Pavic (2004)

•	The Gates. Musical. Libretto by Ghenadie Ciobanu, poetry by Radmila Popovici-Paraschiv (2010)

•	Apolodor. Operă-musical, after The Apolodor by Gelu Naum (2016)

•	Under The Sun and Stars. Symphony (1989)

•	The Birds and The Water. Symphonic pictures for ballet (2001)

•	Enescu Code, for string orchestra (2007)

•	The Rites of Spring. Symphonic Suite: Entree, Dance With  Fires On Snow, Mauntain (2010-2018)

•	The Oriental Songs. Worship to Dimitrie Cantemir for symphonic orchestra (2013)

•	Glance Behind The Curtain/Glance For The Curtain,  for string orchestra (2016)

•	Après une Lecture.  Vocal-symphonic cicle:  The Post-modern Poem, The Rap Poem, The Elegiac Poem. Poetry by Emilian Galaicu-Păun, Valeriu Matei (2014-2016)

•	The Moments. Concerto for violin and symphonic orchestra (2015)

•	The Breeze of Southern Latitudes. Concerto for marimba și and symphonic orchestra (2009)

•	The Ode To Becoming, for choir and symphonic orchestra, poetry by D. Matcovschi (2013)

•	De profundis...My Generation. Cantată for choir and symphonic orchestra Poetry by A. Ahmatova 

•	Deux chansons, for soprano și chamber ensemble. Poetry by Valeriu Matei and Matei Vișniec (2018)

•	The Time Passes. Capriccio, for clarinet and piano (2017)

•	„…cette fois-ci a Paris”. Fantasia quasi una Sonata, pour piano (2017)

•	De sonata meditor, for piano (2003)

•	Sound Etudes for chamber ensemble:  They Will Come From Silence,  ...and coming one by one they will merge, The White Silence, From Overthere, The Since That Are Reflected At Sky (1995-2006)

•	Rhapsody-concerto for piano and symphonic orchestra (1984)

•	Musica dolorosa (1986/87) – symphonic poem 

•	Nostalgia For The Festivity : Concerto No.2 for piano and symphonic orchestra (1988)

•	The Bride's Grief (1993), for mixed choir

•	Our Father (1994)  for mixed choir

•	The Sad Symbols for clarinet (1990)

•	Spatium Sonans  for flute (1997)

•	From Songs And Dances Of Melancholic Moon, cycle for clarinet and percussions (1995-2003)

•	Pentaculus minus, for woodwind cvartet (1996)

•	Brass Quintet (1991)

•	The Ninth Moon, for mezzo-soprano, English horn and percussions 
 
•	Un viaggio immaginario (2000), for string orchestra

Movie music 
“Whirlpool” (1992), directed by Oleg Tulaev; “Medea-80” (1988), directed by Andrei Vartic; “Ladybug” (1991), directed by Alecu Deleu; “Exercise in White” (1991), directed by Sergiu Plămădeală; “The Trial of the Circle” (1991), directed by Alecu Deliu; “Miorița” (1991), directed by Alecu Deleu; “Children’s Dreems”, directed by Sergei Davidoff (USA); “Orange Island” (1985), directed by Liubov Apraxina; “The Best Weapons in the World” (1986), directed by Liubov Apraxina; “Apogones” (1988), directed by Liubov Apraxina; “And It Was Good” (1990), directed by Sergiu Plămădeală; “Salon No 6” (1998), 3 series, directed by Vitalie Țapeș

External links 
 Curtea Constitutionala a validat mandatele a opt noi deputati
 Site-ul Parlamentului Republicii Moldova

References
 Ghenadie Ciobanu. Biobliografie / Acad. de Muzică, Teatru și Arte plastice. , . Chișinău, Editura Lumina, 2016
 Muzicieni din România: Lexicon biobibliografic / Viorel Cosma - Onești; Magic Print, 2016. 

1957 births
Living people
Liberal Democratic Party of Moldova MPs
Moldovan MPs 2009–2010
Moldovan composers
Male composers